Adrián Gyutai (born 12 November 1990) is a Hungarian Grand Prix motorcycle racer. He is 4 times Hungarian Champion (2010 125SP ; 2013 SST600 ; 2021-2022 Superbike) and currently races in the Hungarian Superbike and Alpe-Adria International Championship in Superbike category on a Ducati Panigale V4R. He races for MW Performance Racing Team led by János Mohai.

Career statistics

Grand Prix motorcycle racing

By season

Races by year

External links
 http://www.motogp.com/en/riders/Adrian+Gyutai

References

 https://motorinfo.hu/gyutai_adrian/
 https://p1race.hu/tag/gyutai-adrian/
 https://www.telepaks.net/2022/02/22/magyar-bajnok-gyutai-adrian-motorversenyzo/
 https://nepszava.hu/tag/gyutai-adrian/

Hungarian motorcycle racers
Living people
Place of birth missing (living people)
1990 births